The First Family is an American sitcom that debuted in first-run syndication in the United States on September 22, 2012. Created by Byron Allen and produced by Allen's production company Entertainment Studios, the series (along with Mr. Box Office which debuted the same weekend and is also produced by Entertainment Studios) is the first situation comedy to air in first-run syndication since the 2000 cancellation of Malibu, CA.

Premise
The series centers on William Johnson (Christopher B. Duncan), a politician who attempts to balance his family life with his wife Katherine (Kellita Smith) and their two sons and two daughters as they adjust to living in the White House, while maintaining his duties as the second African-American and 45th President of the United States. William, in turn, also has to deal with other family members, including his father Alvin (John Witherspoon) and his boisterous sister-in-law Pauletta (Jackée Harry), who despite their constant bickering will sometimes partner up for various schemes.

Cast

Main cast
 Christopher B. Duncan – President William Johnson
 Kellita Smith – Katherine Johnson
 Jackée Harry – Pauletta Birdsong
 Michael D. Roberts – Bernard
 Khylin Rhambo – Charles Johnson
 Yara Shahidi (episodes 1–23) – Chloe Johnson
 Sayeed Shahidi (episodes 1–23) – Lucas Johnson
 Layla Crawford – Olivia Johnson
 John Witherspoon – Alvin Johnson

Recurring cast
 Gladys Knight – Carolyn Johnson
 Marla Gibbs – Grandma Eddy
 Lee Reherman – Agent Hardison
 John Eric Bentley – Agent Hill

Episodes

Production
The First Family is primarily syndicated to stations affiliated with The CW and MyNetworkTV and to independent stations for broadcast in weekend primetime timeslots. The series was supposed to produce a total of 104 episodes, borrowing a similarly-formatted episode order as several sitcoms produced and distributed by Debmar-Mercury, such as Tyler Perry's House of Payne and Anger Management (although the aforementioned Debmar-Mercury produced programs operated under a syndication model where the programs were sold to cable networks with an initial ten-episode order and obtained an additional order of at least 90 episodes if the series was successful). 

The series, which was sold as part of a two-hour comedy block with Mr. Box Office, was initially picked up by stations owned by Tribune Broadcasting, Weigel Broadcasting and CBS Television Stations. By May 2012, the program had been sold to stations in markets covering approximately 85% of the United States.

Although the series centers around an African-American president and his family, show creator and executive producer Byron Allen denies that former U.S. president Barack Obama and his family served as the basis for the Johnson family in the series, noting major differences between the show's fictional Johnson family and the real-life Obama family: the William Johnson character is written as being the 45th president (thus, in this fictional universe, Johnson is Obama's successor, as Obama is the 44th president), the Johnsons moved to Washington from Detroit (the Obama family resided in Chicago prior to the presidency), the family in the series has four children (two male and two female, whereas Barack and Michelle Obama have only two children, both female) and that the family's dog is a Golden Retriever (as opposed to a Portuguese Water Dog).

Syndication
On April 4, 2013, Centric acquired the cable syndication rights to all past and future episodes of The First Family, along with Mr. Box Office, with both series began airing on the channel on April 19, 2013.

Accolades

References

External links
 Official website
 

2010s American black sitcoms
2012 American television series debuts
2015 American television series endings
2010s American political comedy television series
Television shows set in Washington, D.C.
First-run syndicated television programs in the United States
English-language television shows
Television series about families
Television series by Entertainment Studios
White House in fiction